I-367 was an Imperial Japanese Navy Type D1 transport submarine. Completed and commissioned in August 1944, she served in World War II and conducted transport missions between Japan and outlying islands until she was converted into a kaiten suicide attack torpedo carrier. She survived the war, surrendered to Allied forces in 1945, and was scuttled in 1946.

Construction and commissioning

I-367 was laid down on 22 October 1943 by Mitsubishi at Kobe, Japan, with the name Submarine No. 5467. She was renamed I-367 prior to completion. She was launched on 28 April 1944 and was completed and commissioned on 15 August 1944.Children's Day (Japan)

Service history

Upon commissioning, I-367 was attached to the Sasebo Naval District and was assigned to Submarine Squadron 11 for workups.

Transport missions
On 31 October 1944, I-367 departed Yokosuka bound for Marcus Island on her first transport mission, carrying 61 metric tons of food and ammunition. She arrived at Marcus Island on 6 November 1944 and returned to Yokosuka, which she reached on 12 November 1944. She departed Yokosuka on 4 December 1944 for her second transport voyage, heading for Wake Island with a cargo of 81 tons of food ammunition. She reached Wake on 17 December 1944, unloaded her cargo, got back underway, and returned to Yokosuka on 1 January 1945.

Kaiten carrier
Submarine Squadron 7 was deactivated on 20 March 1945 and I-367 was reassigned to Submarine Division 15. Meanwhile, after reaching Yokosuka she was converted at Yokosuka Navy Yard from a transport submarine into a kaiten suicide attack torpedo carrier, the conversion involving the removal of her  deck gun and Daihatsu-class landing craft and their replacement with fittings allowing her to carry five kaitens on her deck. Her conversion was completed in late April 1945.

First kaiten mission
While I-367 was undergoing conversion, U.S. forces captured advanced bases and anchorages in the Kerama Islands southwest of Okinawa between 26 and 29 March 1945, and the Battle of Okinawa began when U.S. forces landed on Okinawa itself on 1 April 1945. I-366 and I-367 were designated the Shimbu ("God's Warriors") Kaiten Group, and on 1 May 1945 I-367 moved to the kaiten base at Otsujima to load kaitens so she could deploy to attack Allied ships supporting the fighting on Okinawa. Off Otsujima, she conducted kaiten exercises on 2 and 3 May and a test dive with kaitens aboard on 4 May 1945. On 5 May 1945 — Boys' Day in Japan — she got underway for a patrol area northwest of Saipan flying the traditional Boy's Day koinobori (carp streamer) from the radio antenna on her conning tower. I-366 suffered damage when she struck a magnetic mine off Hikari on 6 May 1945 and could not deploy, so I-367 became the only submarine to patrol as part of the Shimbu Group.

She was east of Okinawa on 27 May 1945 when she sighted a four-ship convoy made up of vessels of United States Navy Service Squadron 6. Three of I-367′s kaitens were defective — two with malfunctioning rudders and one with engine trouble — but from a position on the convoy's port beam, she launched her other two kaitens. The fleet tug  sank one of the kaitens with fire from a Bofors 40 mm gun. I-367 claimed two merchant ships sunk and some reports claimed that the destroyer escort  suffered damage in a kaiten attack on 27 May, but in fact the convoy suffered no damage from I-367′s attack and Gilligan′s damage was inflicted by a kamikaze.

I-367 set course for Japan, arriving at Otsujima on 4 June 1945 to disembark her remaining kaitens and kaiten pilots. She then proceeded to Kure, arriving there on 5 June 1945.

Second kaiten mission

She made no contacts during her patrol. She was off the Bungo Strait on her return voyage to Japan when she received word on 15 August 1945 that Emperor Hirohito had announced the end of hostilities between Japan and the Allies that day. She arrived at Otsujima later that day and disembarked her kaiten pilots, then headed for Kure, which she reached on 16 August 1945. She surrendered to the Allies in September 1945.

Final disposition

I-367 moved from Kure to Sasebo, where she was stripped of all valuable materials and equipment. The Japanese struck her from the Navy list on 30 November 1945.

In Operation Road's End, the U.S. Navy submarine tender  towed I-367 from Sasebo to an area off the Goto Islands on 1 April 1946. Her Japanese crew was taken off by 13:10. At 13:18, demolition charges aboard her exploded and she sank in 30 seconds, the second of a number of Japanese submarines scuttled in the area that day.

Notes

Sources
 Hackett, Bob & Kingsepp, Sander.  IJN Submarine I-367: Tabular Record of Movement.  Retrieved on September 18, 2020.

Type D submarines
Ships built by Mitsubishi Heavy Industries
1944 ships
World War II submarines of Japan
Maritime incidents in 1946
Shipwrecks in the Pacific Ocean
Shipwrecks of Japan
Scuttled vessels